Matarnia is an administrative district of Gdańsk, Poland, located in the western part of the city.

The Gdańsk Lech Wałęsa Airport is located in Matarnia, as well as the Gdańsk Port Lotniczy and Gdańsk Matarnia railway stations.

As part of the Crown of the Kingdom of Poland, Matarnia was a private church village of the Cistercian Monastery in Oliwa, administratively located in the Gdańsk County in the Pomeranian Voivodeship.

Gallery

References

External links
Map of Matarnia

Districts of Gdańsk